Cushing Lake Water Aerodrome  was located  south southwest of Upsala, Ontario, Canada.

References

Transport in Thunder Bay District
Defunct seaplane bases in Ontario